Sergei Aleksandrovich Rastegayev (born 29 January 1972 in Engels) is a Russian football manager and a former player. He manages FC Iskra Engels.

References

1972 births
People from Engels, Saratov Oblast
Living people
Soviet footballers
FC Kryvbas Kryvyi Rih players
Russian footballers
Russian expatriate footballers
Expatriate footballers in Ukraine
FC Sokol Saratov players
FC Fakel Voronezh players
FC Metallurg Lipetsk players
Russian Premier League players
FC Yenisey Krasnoyarsk players
FC Dynamo Bryansk players
FC Okzhetpes players
Expatriate footballers in Kazakhstan
Russian football managers
Association football defenders
Sportspeople from Saratov Oblast